Jhoota Kahin Ka is a 1979 Bollywood film directed by Ravi Tandon. It stars Rishi Kapoor and Neetu Singh in pivotal roles.

Plot
The Rai family consists of four: father, mother, Shanti, and two sons, Ajay and Vijay. While traveling on a ship, they run into a severe storm, which leads to the ship capsizing, and the family getting separated. While Ajay and his mother are together, Rai is separate, and so is Vijay. Wealthy Jagatnarayan Khanna rescues Rai, takes him home, ensures that he is treated well, and makes him a business partner. Years later, the Rai sons have grown up. Ajay is a lowly motor mechanic working in Pinto's Garage, but has big dreams, and a dual life as a Casanova, who is a liar and a conman, who dreams of making it big with a wealthy woman named Sheetal Khanna. Then there is Vijay, who is now known as Vikram, who works for Sheetal Khanna, and hopes to marry her one-day, but has an affair with a gorgeous woman named Mala. When Mala gets pregnant, Vikram refuses to marry her, and an argument ensues. Shortly thereafter, Mala is killed, and Vikram is being blackmailed by a man named Prem, who claims he saw Vikram kill her. When Vikram and Prem find out that Sheetal may marry Ajay, they get together and plot against him - and Ajay's lies, and a dual life, make it easy for them to frame him. One of great movies released in 1979.

Cast

Rishi Kapoor as Ajay Rai
Neetu Singh as Anita Verma / Sheetal Khanna
Rakesh Roshan as Vijay Rai / Vikram
Om Shivpuri as Rai
Prem Chopra Prem
Preeti Ganguli as Paro
Iftekhar as Police Inspector
Pinchoo Kapoor as Jagatnarayan Khanna
Satyendra Kapoor as Pinto, Garage Owner
Javed Khan as Jagjit
Indrani Mukherjee as Mrs. Shanti Rai
Keshto Mukherjee as Rahim
Neelima as Anita Verma
Yunus Parvez as Razdan
Ram Sethi as hotel waiter
Hari Shivdasani as  Faujiram, car owner (Uncredited)
Helen as cabaret dancer
Dara Singh as Body Builder, dance partner in song "Dekho Mera Jaado"
 Gauri Verma as Mala

Soundtrack
'Jeevan Ke Har Mod Pe' sung by Kishore Kumar and Asha Bhosle remains an evergreen classic.

External links
 

1979 films
1970s Hindi-language films
1979 comedy films
Films scored by R. D. Burman